Schladern (Sieg) is a station on the Sieg Railway in Windeck-Schladern in the German state of North Rhine-Westphalia. The station building was built in 1859 and has monument protection. It was built on a section of the Sieg Railway that was opened by the Cologne-Minden Railway Company (CME) between Eitorf and Wissen on 1 August 1861. It has two platform tracks and is classified by Deutsche Bahn as a category 5 station.

Use

The station building, which was no longer occupied by the railway, was purchased in 2002 by the Wirtschaftsförderungs- und Entwicklungsgesellschaft Windeck (Windeck business development and development company), resold and rented out after renovation. In addition to offices, it currently houses a café and a municipal tourist office. There is also a pedelec charging station and an ATM at the station. The stop is used by 15,000 passengers annually.

Services

The station is served by S-Bahn S 12 services from Köln-Ehrenfeld (Horrem in the peak) to Au (Sieg) and S19 services on week days from Düren to Au (Sieg). The S12 services operate hourly, but the S19 services are less frequent.

Heritage-listing

The brick building built in the Wilhelmine style and is listed as item A 169 in the list of monuments in Windeck.

Others

The station was designated in 2014 as a Wanderbahnhof NRW ("hiking station" of NRW). Nearby are the Sieg fall, Mauel Castle and Windeck Castle.

Notes

Railway stations in North Rhine-Westphalia
Rhine-Ruhr S-Bahn stations
S12 (Rhine-Ruhr S-Bahn)
Railway stations in Germany opened in 1860
Buildings and structures in Rhein-Sieg-Kreis